Wilbur Smith (1933–2021) was a South African novelist.

Wilbur Smith may also refer to:
Wilbur C. Smith (1884–1952), American football coach and university administrator
Wilbur M. Smith (1894–1976), American theologian
Wib Smith (born Wilbur Floyd Smith; 1886–1959), Major League Baseball catcher
Wilbur Smith (engineer) (1912–1990), American traffic engineer

See also
 Wilbur Smith, a transportation engineering firm acquired by Camp Dresser & McKee in 2011 to form CDM Smith
Will Smith (disambiguation)